In 1641, Samuel Winslow was granted the first patent in North America by the Massachusetts General Court for a new process for making salt.

See also
History of patent law
History of United States patent law

References

People of colonial Massachusetts
History of patent law